Family Feud is an American television game show.

"Family Feud" may also refer to:

Television shows
Family Feud (franchise), an international franchise based on the American show

Music
Family Feud (album), by The Dayton Family
"Family Feud" (song), a song by Jay-Z featuring Beyoncé from 4:44
"Family Feud", a song by Lil Wayne featuring Drake from Dedication 6: Reloaded

See also
Feud